Awaji-Inombek Dagomie Abiante (born 16 June 1967) is a Nigerian politician and a member of the House of Representatives (Nigeria)   representing Andoni/ Opobo–Nkoro federal constituency in Rivers State. Hon Awaj-inombek Abiante was elected in 2019 as Member of House of Representatives in 9th Nigeria National Assembly under the Peoples Democratic Party (Nigeria).

References

Nigerian politicians
Peoples Democratic Party members of the House of Representatives (Nigeria)
1967 births
Living people